John Ambrose Lillibridge (June 27, 1878 – ?) was an American businessman and college football coach. He served as the head football coach at Maryland Agricultural College—now known as the University of Maryland, College Park—in 1897, compiling a record of 2–4.

Biography
Lillibridge was born in 1878 in Laurel, Maryland and enrolled at the Maryland Agricultural College (now the University of Maryland) in 1894. He played as an end on the football team in 1896 and 1897. Lillibridge served as captain and player-coach in 1897. The Aggies posted a 2–4 record that season.

Lillibridge graduated in 1898 with an A.B. degree through the school's Classical Course. He worked as an accountant for the Maryland Steel Company and then as a sales representative for the Barrett Manufacturing Company.

Head coaching record

References

1878 births
Year of death unknown
19th-century players of American football
American football ends
Player-coaches
Maryland Terrapins football coaches
Maryland Terrapins football players
People from Laurel, Maryland
Coaches of American football from Maryland
Players of American football from Maryland